Kuseyevo (Küsey) is a rural locality (a selo) and the administrative centre of Kuseyevsky Selsoviet, Baymaksky District, Bashkortostan, Russia. The population was 450 as of 2010. There are 10 streets.

Geography 
Kuseyevo is located 75 km north of Baymak (the district's administrative centre) by road. Khalilovo is the nearest rural locality.

References 

Rural localities in Baymaksky District